Something Fierce may refer to:

Book
Something Fierce: Memoirs of a Revolutionary Daughter, by Carmen Aguirre 2011

Music
Something Fierce (band) Mitch Clem
Something Fierce (album), album by Rocktopus 2003
Something Fierce, album by Marian Call 2011
"Something Fierce", song by Rocktopus from the album Something Fierce and Signature Half-Step a Retrospective 2000-2014